DENIS-P J082303.1-491201 (also known as DENIS J082303.1-491201, DE0823-49), is a  binary system of two brown dwarfs, located  from Earth. The system is located in the constellation Vela.

The mass ratio is around 0.64 to 0.74.

The system has an orbital period of 248 days. The age of the system is estimated to be around 80 to 500 million years old, a relatively young object in the solar neighbourhood, however it does not seem to have any association with any moving groups.

DENIS J082303.1-491201 was discovered in 2007 by Ngoc Phan-Bao et al as part of the Deep Near Infrared Survey of the Southern Sky or DENIS for short.

Planetary system
A substellar companion, DENIS-P J082303.1−491201 b was discovered in 2013 and included in the NASA Exoplanet Archive as the first exoplanet discovered by the Astrometry exoplanet detection method.

References

Brown dwarfs
L-type stars
Binary stars
J08230313-4912012
Vela (constellation)
Planetary systems with one confirmed planet